Fred Heese (born February 21, 1943) is a Canadian sprint canoer who competed in the mid-1960s. He finished seventh in the C-2 1000 m event at the 1964 Summer Olympics in Tokyo.

Singapore recently engaged Fred as the Technical Director for the Singapore National Dragon Boat Team. He assumed the position in mid-2009. Fred will be leading the Singapore Dragon Boat team to the 2010 Asian Games in China, November 2010.

References

1943 births
Canadian male canoeists
Canoeists at the 1964 Summer Olympics
Living people
Olympic canoeists of Canada